Silvana Bucher (born 3 February 1984) is a Swiss cross-country skier who has competed since 2001. At the 2010 Winter Olympics in Vancouver, she finished 18th in the team sprint event.

At the FIS Nordic World Ski Championships 2007 in Sapporo, Bucher finished ninth in the 4 × 5 km relay and 25th in the 10 km event.

Her best World Cup finish was fifth in the team sprint event at Russia in January 2010 while her best individual finish was also fifth in an individual sprint event at Norway in March 2010.

Cross-country skiing results
All results are sourced from the International Ski Federation (FIS).

Olympic Games

World Championships

World Cup

Season standings

References

External links

1984 births
Cross-country skiers at the 2010 Winter Olympics
Living people
Olympic cross-country skiers of Switzerland
Swiss female cross-country skiers
Sportspeople from the canton of Lucerne
21st-century Swiss women